Horsfieldia obtusa is a species of plant in the family Myristicaceae. It is endemic to Borneo where it is confined to Sarawak.

References

obtusa
Endemic flora of Borneo
Trees of Borneo
Flora of Sarawak
Data deficient plants
Taxonomy articles created by Polbot